The 2016 CBR Brave season was the Brave's 3rd season in the Australian Ice Hockey League since being founded and entering the league in 2014. The season ran from 23 April 2016 to 28 August 2016 for the Brave. CBR finished fourth in the regular season behind the Melbourne Ice, Perth Thunder and Newcastle North Stars. The Brave qualified for the AIHL Finals in Melbourne and played in semi-final one. Canberra defeated the Ice 4–3 in overtime to qualify for the Goodall Cup Final for the first time in franchise history. The Brave were defeated in the final by the North Stars 1–2.

News

In March 2016, Josh Unice was named as Brave head coach for the 2016 AIHL season. The inexperienced former goaltender was joined by experienced assistant coach Dave Rogina and strength and conditioning trainer Stuart Philps.

In April 2016, The Brave announced their playing roster for the season. The bulk of the roster returned from 2015 but the team confirmed six imported players from overseas including the inter-league transfer of AIHL MVP Geordie Wudrick from the Newcastle North Stars. The Brave also announced two new partnerships in the month of April. Firstly, a new marketing and supporter partnership with Canberra's national baseball team, the Canberra Cavalry. And secondly, a promotional partnership with Australian Defence Force hockey team the Navy Tigersharks with the goal to help promote the sport in the ADF.

Six matches into the 2016 season, import Canadian defenceman, Art Bidlevskii, was hospitalised after a freak accident in an ugly AIHL match in Newcastle between rivals the North Stars and Brave. Art's voice box was shattered, he lost his voice for a period of time, he was almost placed in a coma and he was told he could die if he played ice hockey again. The accident ended the twenty five year old's playing career. Art took up a role as assistant coach with the team following his release from hospital.

In August, one week before the end of the regular season, the CBR Brave management announced the sudden departure of Josh Unice from the team due to personal reasons. Art Bidlevskii was named as replacement head coach on an interim basis for the final match of the regular season and the finals series. The CBR Brave finished the season in fourth place after a surprise 6–4 loss to last placed Sydney Ice Dogs in Liverpool, Sydney. The team qualified for the finals weekend in Melbourne where they would face league premiers, the Melbourne Ice in the first semi-final match.

In September, post-finals, CBR Brave players took out a hat-trick of AIHL player awards for the 2016 season. Czech import, Jan Safar, was named AIHL Defenceman of the season for the second straight year while Casey Kubara was awarded both the Local Player of the year as well as Rookie of the year awards.

Roster

Team roster for the 2016 AIHL season

Transfers

All the player transfers in and out by the CBR Brave for the 2016 AIHL season.

In

Out

Staff

Staff Roster for 2016 AIHL season

Standings

Regular season

Summary

Position by round

League table

Source

Finals

Summary

Bracket

Schedule & results

Regular season

Finals
Goodall Cup semi-final
All times are UTC+10:00

Goodall Cup final

Player statistics

Skaters

Goaltenders

Awards

References

CBR Brave seasons